Vermin is the sixth studio album by Norwegian black metal band Old Man's Child, released on 14 October 2005.

Track listing
All music and lyrics written and composed by Galder, except "Twilight Damnation" (music by Galder and Jardar, lyrics by Galder).
"Enslaved and Condemned" – 4:15
"The Plague of Sorrow" – 4:09
"War of Fidelity" – 4:19
"In Torment's Orbit" – 5:04
"Lord of Command (Bringer of Hate)" – 4:51
"The Flames of Deceit" – 4:39
"Black Marvels of Death" – 4:22
"Twilight Damnation" – 4:42
"...As Evil Descends" – 1:11

Credits
Galder – vocals, lead guitars, bass guitar, acoustic guitars, and keyboards
Reno Kiilerich – drums (session)
Eric Peterson – Guest guitar lead on "In Torment's Orbit"

Additional personnel
 Christophe Szpajdel — logo

References

Old Man's Child albums
2005 albums
Century Media Records albums